Joffrey Baratheon  is a fictional character in the A Song of Ice and Fire series of epic fantasy novels by American author George R. R. Martin, and its HBO television adaptation Game of Thrones. Introduced in 1996's A Game of Thrones, he subsequently appears in A Clash of Kings (1998) and A Storm of Swords (2000). 

Joffrey is officially the eldest son and heir of king Robert Baratheon and Cersei Lannister, but in actuality is the eldest child of Cersei and her twin brother Jaime Lannister.  Joffrey inherits the throne after Robert's death, which, along with his execution of Lord Ned Stark of Winterfell, triggers a power struggle in Westeros known as the War of Five Kings. He is characterized as a spoiled, sadistic bully and frequently torments his family as well as Sansa Stark, to whom he is betrothed in the first novel. He later marries Margaery Tyrell, but is killed by poison during his wedding reception. Joffrey's demise is referred to as The Purple Wedding.

Joffrey is portrayed by Irish actor Jack Gleeson in the television adaptation Game of Thrones, a role for which he received international recognition and critical praise.

Overview 
Joffrey Baratheon is not a point of view character in the novels, so his actions are witnessed and interpreted through the eyes of other people, such as his uncle Tyrion Lannister and his one-time fiancée Sansa Stark. He inherits his mother's traditional Lannister looks, and has blond hair and green eyes, and is believed by many to be very handsome. His appearance is referred to as his one redeeming quality

Character description 
In public, Joffrey is allegedly the oldest son and heir of King Robert Baratheon and Queen Cersei Lannister, both of whom entered into a political marriage alliance after Robert took the throne by force from the "Mad King" Aerys II Targaryen.  In reality, his biological father is his mother's twin brother, Jaime Lannister.  He has a younger sister, Myrcella, and a younger brother, Tommen, both of whom are also products of Jaime and Cersei's incestuous relationship.  Their sole biological grandparents, Tywin and Joanna Lannister, were also first cousins.

Joffrey is an amoral sadist who disguises his cruelty with a thin veneer of charm.  This is best epitomized by his response when his (then) betrothed offends him: Joffrey pronounces that his mother had taught him never to strike a woman, and so commissions a knight of the Kingsguard to hit her instead.  He enjoys forcing people to fight to the death, and enforces cruel punishments for lesser crimes.  He has no sense of personal responsibility, blaming failures on others.  He lacks self-control and often insults his allies and family members. He is also impulsive, which frequently leads him to make rash decisions. He appears to have virtually no interests other than sadism and extreme violence, paying no attention to actually governing his kingdom or to anything involving sex, even when he is offered exceptionally beautiful women. Though he takes pleasure in violence, Joffrey is shown to be a coward when confronted with danger to himself, and often shies away from any real fighting. 

Joffrey is 12 years old at the beginning of A Game of Thrones (1996).

Storylines

A Game of Thrones 

Prince Joffrey is taken by his parents to Winterfell and is betrothed to Sansa Stark in order to create an alliance between House Baratheon and House Stark. At first, Joffrey is kind and polite to Sansa. However, he refuses to show sympathy with the family when Bran Stark falls from a tower, until physically forced to by his uncle, Tyrion Lannister. While on the Kingsroad to King's Landing, Joffrey and Sansa come across Arya Stark practicing swordplay with a commoner Mycah. Joffrey accuses Mycah of assaulting a noble girl and makes a cut on his face with a sword. This causes Arya to hit Joffrey, allowing Mycah to escape. When Joffrey then turns on Arya, her direwolf Nymeria attacks Joffrey, injuring him. Later, Joffrey lies about the attack, saying it was unprovoked and demands Nymeria to be killed; however, Sansa's direwolf Lady is killed instead. He later has his bodyguard Sandor "The Hound" Clegane hunt down and kill Mycah.

Later, Eddard Stark discovers that Joffrey is not King Robert's biological son and refuses to acknowledge Joffrey's claim to the throne when King Robert dies. He is taken into custody. On Sansa's pleas, Eddard issues a false confession of his treason. Joffrey promised Sansa that he would be merciful but then beheads Eddard anyway and later forces Sansa to look upon her father's head.

A Clash of Kings 

Joffrey is briefly seen in A Clash of Kings (1998). He rules with whim and caprice, proving difficult for even his mother to control. Sansa becomes imprisoned to his will, and he frequently has his guards beat her when she displeases him. When Stannis Baratheon attacks King's Landing, Joffrey leaves the battlefield, damaging the morale of his army. The battle is only won by his uncle Tyrion's use of wildfire and his grandfather Tywin's last-minute counterattack aided by the forces of House Tyrell.

A Storm of Swords 

Joffrey sets aside his earlier betrothal to Sansa Stark in favor of Margaery Tyrell, cementing an alliance between the Lannisters and House Tyrell. At Tyrion and Sansa's wedding, he humiliates his uncle and is outraged when his uncle threatens him after he commands him to consummate their marriage. Tyrion only avoids punishment when his father Tywin assures Joffrey that his uncle was drunk and had no intention of threatening the king. Later after the events of the "Red Wedding", Joffrey gleefully plans on serving Sansa her recently deceased brother's head. His uncle Tyrion and his grandfather Tywin are outraged and the former threatens Joffrey once again. After another disagreement, Tywin sends Joffrey to his room, much to Joffrey's chagrin. During his wedding feast, he repeatedly torments Tyrion and Sansa, presenting an offensive play about "The War of the Five Kings", with each of the kings played by dwarves to humiliate his uncle, whom he also forces to act as his cupbearer. At the conclusion of the dinner, however, Joffrey dies from poisoned wine. Tyrion is falsely accused and arrested by Cersei in A Storm of Swords (2000) but it is later revealed that Lady Olenna Tyrell and Lord Petyr Baelish were the true perpetrators.

Family tree

TV adaptation

Season 1 
After Robert's death, Cersei Lannister and her father Tywin Lannister) make Joffrey King, and his mother uses him as a puppet. He is also betrothed to Sansa Stark to cement an alliance between the Houses of Stark and Lannister. A cruel tyrant, Joffrey makes sadistic torture and mass murder the main features of his kingdom, and even has Sansa's father Ned executed for treason (which he declares he will never allow to go unpunished) over Sansa's pleas for mercy and Cersei's disapproval.

Season 2 
Joffrey's tyranny worsens the situation with the Lannisters' war effort, as his uncle (and secretly, father) Jaime (Nikolaj Coster-Waldau) is captured by the Starks, and Joffrey's "paternal uncles" Renly (Gethin Anthony) and Stannis (Stephen Dillane) challenge his claim to the Iron Throne. Joffrey frequently orders his Kingsguard to beat Sansa. His cruelty and ignorance of the commoners' suffering makes him unpopular after he orders the City Watch to kill all of his "father"'s bastard children in King's Landing; consequently, he is almost killed during a riot. When Stannis attacks King's Landing, Joffrey serves only as a figurehead and avoids the heavy fighting. When the battle eventually turns in Stannis' favor, Cersei calls her son into the safety of the castle, damaging the morale of his army. The battle is only won by his uncle Tyrion (Peter Dinklage) and grandfather Tywin, aided by the forces of House Tyrell. To cement the alliance between those families, Joffrey's engagement to Sansa is annulled so he can marry Margaery Tyrell (Natalie Dormer).

Season 3 
The marriage is yet to take place, and rifts are growing between Joffrey, and his uncle Tyrion and grandfather Tywin, who are (in their respective ways) rebutting his cruelty. Joffrey also seems to take little interest in his betrothed, but is amazed and altered by her ways of winning the people's favor, in which he takes part. At Tyrion and Sansa's wedding, he humiliates his uncle and is outraged when his uncle threatens him after Joffrey commands him to consummate the marriage. Tyrion only avoids punishment when his father Tywin assures Joffrey that Tyrion was drunk and had no intention of threatening the king. Later, after the events of the "Red Wedding", Joffrey gleefully plans on serving Sansa her recently deceased brother Robb's (Richard Madden) head. Tyrion and Tywin are outraged, and the former threatens Joffrey once again. After another disagreement, Tywin sends Joffrey to his room, much to Joffrey's chagrin.

Season 4 
Joffrey finally marries Margaery. During his wedding feast, he repeatedly torments Tyrion and Sansa, presenting an offensive play about "The War of the Five Kings", with each of the kings played by dwarves to humiliate his uncle, whom he also forces to act as his cupbearer. At the height of the festivities, Joffrey is suddenly overcome by poison and dies. His last act is an attempt to point at Tyrion, and as a result Tyrion is falsely accused and ordered arrested by Cersei, but it is later revealed that Lady Olenna Tyrell and Lord Petyr Baelish were the true perpetrators. Olenna, Margaery's grandmother, later confides to Margaery that she would never have let her marry "that beast". Following Joffrey's funeral, his younger brother and heir, Tommen, is crowned King and proceeds to marry Margaery.

Development and reception

In January 2007, HBO secured the rights to adapt Martin's series for television. Jack Gleeson was cast as Joffrey Baratheon. Gleeson received critical acclaim for his portrayal. In 2016, Rolling Stone ranked the character #4 in their list of the "40 Greatest TV Villains of All Time". Author Martin described Joffrey as similar to "five or six people that I went to school with ... a classic bully ... incredibly spoiled". Gleason would cite Joaquin Phoenix's portrayal of Commodus in Gladiator as a big influence for his performance.

References

A Song of Ice and Fire characters
Fictional murdered people
Fictional child deaths
Fictional bullies
Literary characters introduced in 1996
Fictional murderers of children
Fictional domestic abusers
Fictional kings
Fictional mass murderers
Fictional offspring of incestuous relationships
Fictional princes
Male characters in television
Male characters in literature
Male literary villains
Fiction about regicide
Teenage characters in literature
Teenage characters in television
Television characters introduced in 2011